Langnau-Gattikon is a railway station in the Sihl Valley, and the municipality of Langnau am Albis, in the Swiss Canton of Zürich. Gattikon is an adjacent settlement, part of the municipality of Thalwil. The station is on the Sihltal line, which is operated by the Sihltal Zürich Uetliberg Bahn (SZU).

The station is served by the following passenger trains:

References

External links 
 

Railway stations in the canton of Zürich
Langnau am Albis
Thalwil